Below is a timeline of notable events related to cryptography.

B.C.
 36th century The Sumerians develop cuneiform writing and the Egyptians develop hieroglyphic writing.
 16th century The Phoenicians develop an alphabet
 600-500 Hebrew scholars make use of simple monoalphabetic substitution ciphers (such as the Atbash cipher)
 c. 400 Spartan use of scytale (alleged)
 c. 400 Herodotus reports use of steganography in reports to Greece from Persia (tattoo on shaved head) 
 100-1 A.D.- Notable Roman ciphers such as the Caesar cipher.

1–1799 A.D.
 801–873 A.D. Cryptanalysis and frequency analysis leading to techniques for breaking monoalphabetic substitution ciphers are developed in A Manuscript on Deciphering Cryptographic Messages by the Muslim mathematician, Al-Kindi (Alkindus), who may have been inspired by textual analysis of the Qur'an. He also covers methods of encipherments, cryptanalysis of certain encipherments, and statistical analysis of letters and letter combinations in Arabic.
 1355-1418 Ahmad al-Qalqashandi writes Subh al-a 'sha, a 14-volume encyclopedia including a section on cryptology, attributed to Ibn al-Durayhim (1312–1361). The list of ciphers in this work include both substitution and transposition, and for the first time, a cipher with multiple substitutions for each plaintext letter. It also included an exposition on and worked example of cryptanalysis, including the use of tables of letter frequencies and sets of letters which cannot occur together in one word.
 1450 The Chinese develop wooden block movable type printing.
 1450–1520 The Voynich manuscript, an example of a possibly encoded illustrated book, is written.
 1466 Leon Battista Alberti invents polyalphabetic cipher, also first known mechanical cipher machine
 1518 Johannes Trithemius' book on cryptology
 1553 Bellaso invents Vigenère cipher
 1585 Vigenère's book on ciphers
 1586 Cryptanalysis used by spymaster Sir Francis Walsingham to implicate Mary, Queen of Scots, in the Babington Plot to murder Elizabeth I of England. Queen Mary was eventually executed.
 1641 Wilkins' Mercury (English book on cryptology)
 1793 Claude Chappe establishes the first long-distance semaphore telegraph line
 1795 Thomas Jefferson invents the Jefferson disk cipher, reinvented over 100 years later by Etienne Bazeries

1800–1899
 1809–14 George Scovell's work on Napoleonic ciphers during the Peninsular War
 1831 Joseph Henry proposes and builds an electric telegraph
 1835 Samuel Morse develops the Morse code
 1854 Charles Wheatstone invents Playfair cipher
 c. 1854 Babbage's method for breaking polyalphabetic ciphers (pub 1863 by Kasiski)
 1855 For the English side in Crimean War, Charles Babbage broke Vigenère's autokey cipher (the 'unbreakable cipher' of the time) as well as the much weaker cipher that is called Vigenère cipher today. Due to secrecy it was also discovered and attributed somewhat later to the Prussian Friedrich Kasiski.
 1883 Auguste Kerckhoffs' La Cryptographie militare published, containing his celebrated laws of cryptography
 1885 Beale ciphers published
 1894 The Dreyfus Affair in France involves the use of cryptography, and its misuse, in regard to false documents.

1900–1949
 1916-1922 William Friedman and Elizebeth Smith Friedman apply statistics to cryptanalysis (coincidence counting, etc.), write Riverbank Publications
 1917 Gilbert Vernam develops first practical implementation of a teletype cipher, now known as a stream cipher and, later, with Joseph Mauborgne the one-time pad
 1917 Zimmermann telegram intercepted and decrypted, advancing U.S. entry into World War I
 1919 Weimar Germany Foreign Office adopts (a manual) one-time pad for some traffic
 1919 Edward Hebern invents/patents first rotor machine design—Damm, Scherbius and Koch follow with patents the same year 
 1921 Washington Naval Conference U.S. negotiating team aided by decryption of Japanese diplomatic telegrams
 c. 1924 MI8 (Herbert Yardley, et al.) provide breaks of assorted traffic in support of US position at Washington Naval Conference
 c. 1932 first break of German Army Enigma by Marian Rejewski in Poland
 1929 United States Secretary of State Henry L. Stimson shuts down State Department cryptanalysis "Black Chamber", saying "Gentlemen do not read each other's mail."
 1931 The American Black Chamber by Herbert O. Yardley is published, revealing much about American cryptography
 1940 Break of Japan's PURPLE machine cipher by SIS team
 December 7, 1941 attack on Pearl Harbor; U.S. Navy base at Pearl Harbor in Oahu is surprised by Japanese attack, despite U.S. breaking of Japanese codes. U.S. enters World War II.
 June 1942 Battle of Midway where U.S. partial break into Dec 41 edition of JN-25 leads to turning-point victory over Japan
 April 1943 Admiral Yamamoto, architect of Pearl Harbor attack, is assassinated by U.S. forces who know his itinerary from decoded messages
 April 1943 Max Newman, Wynn-Williams, and their team (including Alan Turing) at the secret Government Code and Cypher School ('Station X'), Bletchley Park, Bletchley, England, complete the "Heath Robinson". This is a specialized machine for cipher-breaking, not a general-purpose calculator or computer.
 December 1943 The Colossus computer was built, by Thomas Flowers at The Post Office Research Laboratories in London, to crack the German Lorenz cipher (SZ42). Colossus was used at Bletchley Park during World War II as a successor to April's 'Robinson's. Although 10 were eventually built, unfortunately they were destroyed immediately after they had finished their work it was so advanced that there was to be no possibility of its design falling into the wrong hands.
 1944 Patent application filed on SIGABA code machine used by U.S. in World War II.  Kept secret, it finally issues in 2001
 1946 The Venona project's first break into Soviet espionage traffic from the early 1940s
 1948 Claude Shannon writes a paper that establishes the mathematical basis of information theory.
 1949 Shannon's Communication Theory of Secrecy Systems published in Bell Labs Technical Journal

1950–1999
 1951 U.S. National Security Agency founded. KL-7 rotor machine introduced sometime thereafter.
 1957 First production order for KW-26 electronic encryption system.
 August 1964 Gulf of Tonkin Incident leads U.S. into Vietnam War, possibly due to misinterpretation of signals intelligence by NSA.
1967 David Kahn's The Codebreakers is published.
 1968 John Anthony Walker walks into the Soviet Union's embassy in Washington and sells information on KL-7 cipher machine. The Walker spy ring operates until 1985.
 1969 The first hosts of ARPANET, Internet's ancestor, are connected.
 1970 Using quantum states to encode information is first proposed: Stephen Wiesner invents conjugate coding and applies it to design “money physically impossible to counterfeit” (still technologically unfeasible today).
 1974? Horst Feistel develops Feistel network block cipher design.
 1976 The Data Encryption Standard published as an official Federal Information Processing Standard (FIPS) for the United States.
 1976 Diffie and Hellman publish New Directions in Cryptography.
 1977 RSA public key encryption invented.
 1978 Robert McEliece invents the McEliece cryptosystem, the first asymmetric encryption algorithm to use randomization in the encryption process.
 1981 Richard Feynman proposed quantum computers. The main application he had in mind was the simulation of quantum systems, but he also mentioned the possibility of solving other problems.
 1984 Based on Stephen Wiesner's idea from the 1970s, Charles Bennett and Gilles Brassard design the first quantum cryptography protocol, BB84.
 1985 Walker spy ring uncovered. Remaining KL-7's withdrawn from service.
 1986 After an increasing number of break-ins to government and corporate computers, United States Congress passes the Computer Fraud and Abuse Act, which makes it a crime to break into computer systems. The law, however, does not cover juveniles.
 1988 African National Congress uses computer-based one-time pads to build a network inside South Africa.
 1989 Tim Berners-Lee and Robert Cailliau built the prototype system which became the World Wide Web at CERN.
 1989 Quantum cryptography experimentally demonstrated in a proof-of-the-principle experiment by Charles Bennett et al.
 1991 Phil Zimmermann releases the public key encryption program PGP along with its source code, which quickly appears on the Internet.
 1994 Bruce Schneier's Applied Cryptography is published.
 1994 Secure Sockets Layer (SSL) encryption protocol released by Netscape.
 1994 Peter Shor devises an algorithm which lets quantum computers determine the factorization of large integers quickly. This is the first interesting problem for which quantum computers promise a significant speed-up, and it therefore generates a lot of interest in quantum computers.
 1994 DNA computing proof of concept on toy travelling salesman problem; a method for input/output still to be determined.
 1994 Russian crackers siphon $10 million from Citibank and transfer the money to bank accounts around the world. Vladimir Levin, the 30-year-old ringleader, uses his work laptop after hours to transfer the funds to accounts in Finland and Israel. Levin stands trial in the United States and is sentenced to three years in prison. Authorities recover all but $400,000 of the stolen money.
 1994 Formerly proprietary, but un-patented, RC4 cipher algorithm is published on the Internet.
 1994 First RSA Factoring Challenge from 1977 is decrypted as The Magic Words are Squeamish Ossifrage.
 1995 NSA publishes the SHA1 hash algorithm as part of its Digital Signature Standard.
 July 1997 OpenPGP specification (RFC 2440) released
 1997 Ciphersaber, an encryption system based on RC4 that is simple enough to be reconstructed from memory, is published on Usenet.
 October 1998 Digital Millennium Copyright Act (DMCA) becomes law in U.S., criminalizing production and dissemination of technology that can circumvent technical measures taken to protect copyright.
 October 1999 DeCSS, a computer program capable of decrypting content on a DVD, is published on the Internet.

2000 and beyond
 January 14, 2000 U.S. Government announce restrictions on export of cryptography are relaxed (although not removed). This allows many US companies to stop the long running process of having to create US and international copies of their software.
 March 2000 President of the United States Bill Clinton says he doesn't use e-mail to communicate with his daughter, Chelsea Clinton, at college because he doesn't think the medium is secure.
 September 6, 2000 RSA Security Inc. released their RSA algorithm into the public domain, a few days in advance of their  expiring. Following the relaxation of the U.S. government export restrictions, this removed one of the last barriers to the worldwide distribution of much software based on cryptographic systems
 2000 UK Regulation of Investigatory Powers Act requires anyone to supply their cryptographic key to a duly authorized person on request
 2001 Belgian Rijndael algorithm selected as the U.S. Advanced Encryption Standard (AES) after a five-year public search process by  National Institute of Standards and Technology (NIST)
 2001 Scott Fluhrer, Itsik Mantin and Adi Shamir publish an attack on WiFi's Wired Equivalent Privacy security layer
 September 11, 2001 U.S. response to terrorist attacks hampered by lack of secure communications
 November 2001 Microsoft and its allies vow to end "full disclosure" of security vulnerabilities by replacing it with "responsible" disclosure guidelines
 2002 NESSIE project releases final report / selections
 August 2002, PGP Corporation formed, purchasing assets from NAI.
 2003 CRYPTREC project releases 2003 report / recommendations
 2004 The hash MD5 is shown to be vulnerable to practical collision attack
 2004 The first commercial quantum cryptography system becomes available from id Quantique.
 2005 Potential for attacks on SHA1 demonstrated
 2005 Agents from the U.S. FBI demonstrate their ability to crack WEP using publicly available tools
 May 1, 2007 Users swamp Digg.com with copies of a 128-bit key to the AACS system used to protect HD DVD and Blu-ray video discs. The user revolt was a response to Digg's decision, subsequently reversed, to remove the keys, per demands from the motion picture industry that cited the U.S. DMCA anti-circumvention provisions.
 November 2, 2007 NIST hash function competition announced.
 2009 Bitcoin network was launched.
 2010 The master key for High-bandwidth Digital Content Protection (HDCP) and the private signing key for the Sony PlayStation 3 game console are recovered and published using separate cryptoanalytic attacks. PGP Corp. is acquired by Symantec.
 2012 NIST selects the Keccak algorithm as the winner of its SHA-3 hash function competition.
 2013 Edward Snowden discloses a vast trove of classified documents from NSA. See Global surveillance disclosures (2013–present)
 2013 Dual_EC_DRBG is discovered to have a NSA backdoor.
 2013 NSA publishes Simon and Speck lightweight block ciphers.
 2014 The Password Hashing Competition accepts 24 entries.
 2015 Year by which NIST suggests that 80-bit keys be phased out.

See also
 History of cryptography

References

External links
 Timeline of Cipher Machines

Cryptography
History of cryptography
Cryptography lists and comparisons